William Richert (October 28, 1858 – June 16, 1912) served as acting Mayor of Detroit, from March 22 to April 5, 1897, following the resignation of Hazen S. Pingree.

Biography
Richert's family moved from Germany to the United States when he was a teenager, and he became a grocer and wholesale liquor distributor. He served on the Detroit City Council as a Republican from 1890 to 1897, and as its president in 1895 and 1897. When Hazen S. Pingree was elected Governor of Michigan in 1897, Richert served as acting mayor until a special election was held. He ran unsuccessfully for state senate in 1899.

Richert later assisted a number of Germans to settle in Alameda, Saskatchewan. He also worked as a foreman for the Detroit Board of Public Works.

William Richert died in Detroit in on June 16, 1912. He was buried at Elmwood Cemetery in Detroit.

References

External links

1858 births
1912 deaths
Mayors of Detroit
Detroit City Council members
Michigan Republicans
Burials at Elmwood Cemetery (Detroit)
19th-century American politicians